Frechilla is a surname. Notable people with the surname include:

Gonzalo Frechilla (born 1990), Dominican soccer player
Miguel Ángel Frechilla (born 1974), Spanish rugby union player